Alakh Prakash Goyal Shimla University (AGU) is a private university located near Shimla, Himachal Pradesh, India on the Mehli Shoghi bypass road. The university was established in 2012 by the  A.P. Goyal Charitable Trust through the APG (Alakh Prakash Goyal) Shimla  University Establishment and Regulation Act, 2012.

Schools
The university has the following eight schools:
 School of Advance Computing
 School of Engineering and Technology
 School of Legal Studies and Research
 School of Sciences
 School of Design
 School of Management
 School of Hospitality and Tourism Management
 School of Architecture and Planning
 School of Journalism and Mass Communication
 School of Art and Humanities

Approval
Like all universities in India, Alakh Prakash Goyal Shimla University is recognised by the University Grants Commission (India) (UGC), which has also sent an expert committee and accepted compliance of observations and deficiencies. The School of Architecture's 5-year Bachelor of Architecture programme is approved by the Council of Architecture (COA). The programmes by the School of Legal Studies and Research are approved by the Bar Council of India (BCI). The university is also a member of the Association of Indian Universities (AIU).

References

External links

Education in Shimla
Universities in Himachal Pradesh
Educational institutions established in 2012
2012 establishments in Himachal Pradesh
Private universities in India